Lappi is the name for several geographical areas.

In Finland:
 Lappi is the Finnish name for Lapland and the northernmost region of Finland.
 Laponia (historical province), a historical province of Sweden (including modern Finland), known as Lappi in Finnish.
 Laponia (historical province of Finland), the Finnish portion of the former Swedish province after it was ceded to the Russian Empire in 1809.
 Lappi, Finland is a former municipality in the Satakunta region
 Lappi, Tampere is a district in the city of Tampere

In Pakistan:
 Lappi, another name for Lapiwala in Punjab, Pakistan.